William Kay Higson (1843-1931) was a politician in Queensland, Australia. He was a Member of the Queensland Legislative Assembly.

Early life and education 
The son of Thomas and Mary (née Kay) Higson, he was born in Giggleswick, Yorkshire, England and educated in Yorkshire.

Pre-parliamentary career 
In 1865 Higson set up a business as a fruiterer. He later became a produce and railway contract merchant before establishing himself as a general merchant until he retired 1914. Alderman Rockhampton.

Political life 

Higson was an alderman in the city of Rockhampton and represented Rockhampton in the Legislative Assembly from 1883–1888.

He was a member of the Committee of Rockhampton Jockey Club and raced several champion horses at Callaghan Park.

References

Members of the Queensland Legislative Assembly
1843 births
1931 deaths
English emigrants to colonial Australia
British emigrants to Australia